This is a list of American comedy films.

Comedy films are separated into two categories: short films and feature films.  Any film over 40 minutes long is considered to be of feature-length (although most feature films produced since 1950 are considerably longer, those made in earlier eras frequently ranged from little more than an hour to as little as four reels, which amounted to about 44 minutes).

Short comedy films

1890s
1894
Fred Ott's Sneeze

1895
Chinese Laundry Scene, also known as Robetta and Doretto, No. 2
Robetta and Doretto, No. 1
Robetta and Doretto, No. 3

1896
Gardener Watering Plants
Interrupted Lover

1897
In a Chinese Laundry
The Milker's Mishap
New Pillow Fight
Young America

1898
The Dude's Experience with a Girl on a Tandem
The Inquisitive Girls
Little Willie and the Minister
The Minister's Wooing
A Narrow Escape
The Nearsighted School Teacher
The Old Maid and the Burglar

1899
Armor vs. Armour
An Exciting Finish

1900s
1900
Above the Limit
shuuuuuush Bed
Clowns Spinning Hats
The Enchanted Drawing
I Had to Leave a Happy Home for You

1901
Another Job for the Undertaker
Boxing in Barrels
A Joke on Grandma
What Happened on Twenty-third Street, New York City

1903
I Want My Dinner
The Magical Tramp

1905
Everybody Works but Father
The Little Train Robbery
Raffles the Dog

1906
Dr. Dippy's Sanitarium
Humorous Phases of Funny Faces

1907
College Chums

1908
Balked at the Altar
A Calamitous Elopement
The Painter's Revenge
The Taming of the Shrew
The Thieving Hand

1909
Ben's Kid
Cohen at Coney Island
The Curtain Pole
Making It Pleasant for Him
Mr. Flip
Mrs. Jones' Birthday
The New Cop
Tag Day
Those Awful Hats

1910s
1910
Davy Jones and Captain Bragg, directed by George D. Baker
Making a Man of Him

1911
Money to Burn, by Edwin S. Porter

1912
Making a Man of Her, directed by Al Christie
A Near-Tragedy, directed by Mack Sennett
The New Neighbor, directed by Mack Sennett
O'Brien's Busy Day, directed by Otis Turner

1913
Nursery Favorites

1914
Between Showers
A Busy Day
Kid Auto Races at Venice
Cruel, Cruel Love
A Film Johnnie
The Good for Nothing
Recreation
The Knockout
Between Showers
Making a Living
The New Janitor
Twenty Minutes of Love

1915
 Work
 A Night Out
Hot Finish
Fatty's Tintype Tangle
A Night in the Show
Ragtime Snap Shots
The Tramp
A Woman

1916
American Aristocracy
Behind the Screen
The Fireman
The Floorwalker
The Pawnshop
The Vagabond

1917
The Adventurer
Back Stage
Easy Street
The Immigrant

1918
"Triple Trouble"
The Cook
Fireman Save My Child
Good Night, Nurse!
O, It's Great to Be Crazy

1919
"A Day's Pleasure"
"Sunnyside"
Back Stage
The Hayseed
Hoot Mon!, directed by Hal Roach, starring Stan Laurel
Hustling for Health

1920s
1920
The Garage
One Week

1921
Among Those Present
The Goat
The Idle Class
The Lucky Dog
Never Weaken
Now or Never

1922
Cops
Glad Bags
Mixed Nuts
Mud and Sand
Our Gang - a long-running series of short films which began that year
Pay Day

1923
The Balloonatic
Dogs of War
Gas and Air
Kill or Cure
The Love Nest
The Pilgrim
A Powder Romance

1924
Mother, Mother, Mother Pin a Rose on Me
Portage Due
Sherlock Jr.
Why Men Work

1925
Dr. Pyckle and Mr. Pryde
His Wooden Wedding
Seven Chances

1926
Bromo and Juliet
Crazy like a Fox
Dog Shy
Mighty Like a Moose
My Old Kentucky Home
The Strong Man
Tramp, Tramp, Tramp

1927
Do Detectives Think?
Fluttering Hearts
Hats Off
His First Flame
Long Pants
Love 'em and Weep
The General

1928
The Gallopin' Gaucho
Limousine Love
Pass the Gravy
Plane Crazy
Steamboat Willie
Two Tars
You're Darn Tootin'

1929
Big Business
Lambchops
Unaccustomed As We Are

1930s
1930
One Way Out
Shivering Shakespeare
Teacher's Pet

1931
Beau Hunks
Chickens Come Home
Helpmates
The House That Shadows Built
Our Wife

1932
County Hospital
The Hollywood Handicap
The Music Box
Running Hollywood
The Voice of Hollywood No, 13

1933
Busy Bodies
The Midnight Patrol
Twice Two

1934
Going Bye-Bye!
Odor in the Court
Punch Drunks
Woman Haters

1935
Pop Goes the Easel
Thicker than Water
Tit for Tat

1936
Movie Maniacs

1937

1938
Termites of 1938

1939

1940
The Heckler
The New Pupil

Feature-length films

1910s
1910

1911

1912

1913

1914
Brewster's Millions
A Golf Insect
Tillie's Punctured Romance

1915
A Black Sheep
The Earl of Pawtucket

1916
The Habit of Happiness
The Traveling Salesman

1917
An Aerial Joy Ride
The Poor Little Rich Girl
Rebecca of Sunnybrook Farm

1918
All Night
Amarilly of Clothes-Line Alley
Fair Enough
Shoulder Arms

1919
The Adventure Shop
After His Own Heart
Daddy-Long-Legs
The Hoodlum

1920s
1920
Easy to Get
Life of the Party
Pollyanna
The Round-Up
The Saphead
Suds

1921
Brewster's Millions
Crazy to Marry
The Dollar-a-Year Man
Eden and Return
The Fast Freight or Freight Prepaid or Via Fast Freight
Gasoline Gus
The Girl in the Taxi
Humor Risk
Keeping up with Lizzie
The Kid
Leap Year
A Sailor-Made Man
The Traveling Salesman

1922
Don't Get Personal
Dr. Jack
Gay and Devilish
Grandma's Boy
The Ladder Jinx
Red Hot Romance
Up and at 'Em

1923
The Near Lady
Our Hospitality
Safety Last!
Souls for Sale
Three Ages
Why Worry?

1924
Girl Shy
Happiness
Hot Water
The Last Man on Earth
Lover's Lane
The Navigator

1925
The Eagle
The Freshman
The Gold Rush

1926
For Heaven's Sake
The General
The Strong Man
Tramp, Tramp, Tramp

1927
Fireman, Save My Child
His First Flame
The Kid Brother
Long Pants
Three's a Crowd

1928
The Chaser
The Circus
A Girl in Every Port
The Matinee Idol
Show People
Speedy
Steamboat Bill, Jr.

1929
The Cocoanuts
The Hollywood Revue of 1929
Jazz Heaven
Navy Blues
Rio Rita
Street Girl
Tanned Legs
The Vagabond Lover
The Very Idea
Welcome Danger
The Wild Party
Words and Music

1930s
1930
Animal Crackers
Check and Double Check
The Cuckoos
Dixiana
Feet First
Half Shot at Sunrise
He Knew Women
Hook, Line & Sinker
Leathernecking
Lovin' the Ladies
Queen High
The Rogue Song
The Runaway Bride
She's My Weakness
Sin Takes a Holiday
Whoopee!
A Woman Commands

1931
Bachelor Apartment
The Big Shot
Caught Plastered
City Lights
Cracked Nuts
Ever Since Eve
Everything's Rosie
Fanny Foley Herself
The Front Page
Girls Demand Excitement
High Stakes
Laugh and Get Rich
Lonely Wives
Monkey Business
Peach O'Reno
Platinum Blonde
The Royal Bed
The Runaround
Sweepstakes
The Tip-Off
Too Many Cooks
White Shoulders

1932
The Animal Kingdom
Fireman, Save My Child
Girl Crazy
The Half-Naked Truth
Hold 'Em Jail
Horse Feathers
Ladies of the Jury
Lady with a Past
Little Orphan Annie
Love Me Tonight
Million Dollar Legs
Movie Crazy
The Penguin Pool Murder
That's My Boy
This Is the Night

1933
Bed of Roses
Blind Adventure
Bombshell
Christopher Bean
Dinner at Eight
Diplomaniacs
Duck Soup
Flying Down to Rio
Goldie Gets Along
Goodbye Love
His Private Secretary
I'm No Angel
International House
It's Great to Be Alive
Melody Cruise
Our Betters
Professional Sweetheart
Rafter Romance
Sailor Be Good
She Done Him Wrong
So this is Africa
Sons of the Desert
Topaze

1934
The Affairs of Cellini
Babes in Toyland
Bachelor Bait
By Your Leave
The Cat's-Paw
Cockeyed Cavaliers
The Dover Road
Down to Their Last Yacht
The Gay Divorcee
Hips, Hips, Hooray!
It Happened One Night
It's a Gift
Kentucky Kernels
Lightning Strikes Twice
The Meanest Gal in Town
The Richest Girl in the World
Sing and Like It
Strictly Dynamite
The Thin Man
We're Rich Again

1935
Another Face
Captain Hurricane
Enchanted April
The Farmer Takes a Wife
Hi, Gaucho!
His Family Tree
Hooray for Love
Hot Tip
I Dream Too Much
In Person
Laddie
A Night at the Opera
The Nitwits
Paradise Canyon
The Rainmakers
Romance in Manhattan
Ruggles of Red Gap
Star of Midnight
To Beat the Band
Top Hat

1936
The Bride Walks Out
Bunker Bean
Dancing Pirate
The Ex-Mrs. Bradford
The Farmer in the Dell
Follow the Fleet
Libeled Lady
Love on a Bet
Make Way for a Lady
The Milky Way
Modern Times
Mr. Deeds Goes to Town
Mummy's Boys
My Man Godfrey
Silly Billies
Smartest Girl in Town
Swing Time
Sylvia Scarlett
Theodora Goes Wild
Walking on Air
Wife vs. Secretary

1937
All Over Town
The Awful Truth
The Big Shot
Breakfast for Two
A Damsel in Distress
A Day at the Races
Don't Tell the Wife
Double Wedding
Fight for Your Lady
Fit for a King
Forty Naughty Girls
Hideaway
High Flyers
History Is Made At Night
Hitting a New High
The King and the Chorus Girl
The Life of the Party
Make a Wish
Meet the Missus
Music for Madame
New Faces of 1937
Nothing Sacred
On Again, Off Again
Quick Money
Riding on Air
Shall We Dance
She's Got Everything
Super-Sleuth
That Girl from Paris
There Goes the Groom
There Goes My Girl
They Wanted to Marry
Too Many Wives
Topper
Way Out West
We're on the Jury
When's Your Birthday?
Wise Girl
You Can't Beat Love

1938
The Affairs of Annabel
The Amazing Dr. Clitterhouse
Annabel Takes a Tour
Blond Cheat
Bringing Up Baby
Carefree
Crashing Hollywood
Everybody's Doing It
Go Chase Yourself
Having Wonderful Time
Joy of Living
Love Finds Andy Hardy
The Mad Miss Manton
Maid's Night Out
Mr. Doodle Kicks Off
Next Time I Marry
Night Spot
Peck's Bad Boy with the Circus
Professor Beware
Radio City Revels
Room Service
A Slight Case of Murder
This Marriage Business
Vivacious Lady
You Can't Take It with You

1939
At the Circus
Bachelor Mother
The Cowboy Quarterback
Dancing Co-Ed
East Side of Heaven
Escape to Paradise
Fifth Avenue Girl
The Flying Deuces
The Girl from Mexico
Honolulu
It's a Wonderful World
Mr. Smith Goes to Washington
Ninotchka
Topper Takes a Trip
The Women

1940s
1940
The Bank Dick
The Ghost Breakers
Go West
The Great Dictator
The Great McGinty
His Girl Friday
The Invisible Woman
My Favorite Wife
My Little Chickadee
One Night in the Tropics
The Philadelphia Story
The Shop Around the Corner

1941
Andy Hardy's Private Secretary
Ball of Fire
The Big Store
The Bride Came C.O.D.
Buck Privates
The Devil and Miss Jones
The Flame of New Orleans
Here Comes Mr. Jordan
The Lady Eve
Las Vegas Nights
Never Give a Sucker an Even Break
Topper Returns
Two-Faced Woman

1942
Highways by Night
The Man Who Came to Dinner
A Night to Remember
The Palm Beach Story
Rio Rita
Road to Morocco
Ship Ahoy
Tales of Manhattan
The Talk of the Town
There's One Born Every Minute
To Be or Not to Be
Woman of the Year
You Were Never Lovelier

1943
Crazy House
DuBarry Was a Lady
Government Girl
Heaven Can Wait
Hello, Frisco, Hello
Hit the Ice
I Dood It
A Lady Takes a Chance
The More the Merrier
Mr. Lucky
Slightly Dangerous
They Got Me Covered
Thousands Cheer
Two Weeks to Live
Whistling in Brooklyn

1944
Arsenic and Old Lace
Hail the Conquering Hero
Lady in the Dark
The Miracle of Morgan's Creek
Private Hargrove
Sensations of 1945
Standing Room Only

1945
Along Came Jones
The Bullfighters
Eadie was A Lady
The Horn Blows at Midnight
Lady on a Train
Scared Stiff

1946
Angel on My Shoulder
The Great Morgan
Little Giant
Lover Come Back
Monsieur Beaucaire
A Night in Casablanca
The Time of Their Lives
Vacation in Reno
Without Reservations

1947
The Bachelor and the Bobby-Soxer (AKA Bachelor Knight)
Buck Privates Come Home
Christmas Eve
The Egg and I
The Farmer's Daughter
Magic Town
Miracle on 34th Street
Monsieur Verdoux
Road to Rio
The Sin of Harold Diddlebock
Suddenly, It's Spring
The Voice of the Turtle
Where There's Life

1948
Abbott and Costello Meet Frankenstein
The Emperor Waltz
A Foreign Affair
June Bride
Mr. Blandings Builds His Dream House
The Noose Hangs High
The Paleface
Sitting Pretty
Variety Time

1949
Adam's Rib
Africa Screams
Holiday Affair
I Was a Male War Bride
It's a Great Feeling
My Friend Irma

1950s
1950           
Abbott and Costello in the Foreign Legion
Born Yesterday
Champagne for Caesar
Cheaper by the Dozen
Duchess of Idaho
Father of the Bride
The Great Rupert
Harvey
The Jackpot
Key to the City
Love Happy
My Friend Irma Goes West
Two Weeks with Love
The West Point Story

1951
Abbott and Costello Meet the Invisible Man
An American in Paris
Angels in the Outfield
Comin' Round the Mountain
Double Dynamite
Father's Little Dividend
Half Angel
My Favorite Spy

1952
Abbott and Costello Meet Captain Kidd
Bela Lugosi Meets a Brooklyn Gorilla
A Girl in Every Port
Jumping Jacks
Lost in Alaska
Monkey Business
Road to Bali
Singin' in the Rain
Son of Paleface

1953
Abbott and Costello Go to Mars
Abbott and Costello Meet Dr. Jekyll and Mr. Hyde
The Affairs of Dobie Gillis
The Band Wagon
The Caddy
The Girls of Pleasure Island
How to Marry a Millionaire
It Happens Every Thursday
The Moon Is Blue
Roman Holiday
Scared Stiff

1954
Casanova's Big Night
Fireman, Save My Child
It Should Happen to You
Knock on Wood
Sabrina

1955
Abbott and Costello Meet the Mummy
Mister Roberts
My Sister Eileen
The Seven Year Itch
The Trouble with Harry

1956
Bus Stop
The Court Jester
Forever, Darling
The Girl Can't Help It
Hollywood or Bust
Our Miss Brooks
Pardners
The Teahouse of the August Moon

1957
The Delicate Delinquent
Funny Face
The Girl Most Likely
Joe Butterfly
Love in the Afternoon
Sayonara
Will Success Spoil Rock Hunter?

1958
Auntie Mame
Houseboat
The Matchmaker
Paris Holiday
Teacher's Pet
The Tunnel of Love

1959
Alias Jesse James
A Bucket of Blood
Have Rocket, Will Travel
Pillow Talk
The Shaggy Dog
Some Like It Hot

1960s
1960
The Apartment
The Bellboy
Cinderfella
It Started in Naples
The Little Shop of Horrors
North to Alaska
Ocean's Eleven
Where the Boys Are

1961
The Absent-Minded Professor
All Hands on Deck
Bachelor in Paradise (film)
Blue Hawaii
Breakfast at Tiffany's
Come September
Cry for Happy
The Errand Boy
Everything's Ducky
Gidget Goes Hawaiian
The Happy Thieves
The Ladies Man
Lover Come Back
One Hundred and One Dalmatians
One, Two, Three
The Parent Trap
Pocketful of Miracles
Snow White and the Three Stooges

1962
Boy's Night Out
Girls! Girls! Girls!
Hatari!
Mr. Hobbs Takes a Vacation
The Horizontal Lieutenant
The Road to Hong Kong
The Three Stooges in Orbit
The Three Stooges Meet Hercules

1963
The Courtship of Eddie's Father
Donovan's Reef
Fun in Acapulco
It's a Mad, Mad, Mad, Mad World
McLintock!
The Nutty Professor
The Pink Panther
Spencer's Mountain
The Three Stooges Go Around the World in a Daze

1964
A Shot in the Dark
The Americanization of Emily
The Brass Bottle
Dear Heart
The Disorderly Orderly
Ensign Pulver
Good Neighbor Sam
Kiss Me, Stupid
Mary Poppins
My Fair Lady
The Patsy
Send Me No Flowers
The World of Henry Orient

1965
Beach Blanket Bingo
Boeing Boeing
Cat Ballou
Dear Brigitte
The Family Jewels
The Great Race
The Hallelujah Trail
Harum Scarum
How to Murder Your Wife
Love and Kisses
The Outlaws IS Coming
The Sound of Music
Tickle Me
What's New, Pussycat?

1966
Boy, Did I Get a Wrong Number!
Follow Me, Boys!
The Fortune Cookie
Frankie and Johnny
The Ghost and Mr. Chicken
Murderers' Row
Our Man Flint
Paradise, Hawaiian Style
The Russians Are Coming, the Russians Are Coming
The Silencers
Spinout
The Trouble with Angels (film)
Walk Don't Run
Way...Way Out
What's Up, Tiger Lily?

1967
The Ambushers
Barefoot in the Park
The Big Mouth
David Holzman's Diary
Don't Make Waves
The Graduate
Guess Who's Coming to Dinner
The Happening
The Jungle Book
Luv
Mars Needs Women
The President's Analyst
The Reluctant Astronaut

1968
Don't Raise the Bridge, Lower the River
Funny Girl
Greetings
Inspector Clouseau
Live a Little, Love a Little
The Odd Couple
The Party
The Producers
The Secret War of Harry Frigg
The Shakiest Gun in the West
Skidoo
Stay Away, Joe
Where Angels Go, Trouble Follows

1969
Angel in My Pocket
The April Fools
Bob & Carol & Ted & Alice
Cactus Flower
Change of Habit
Don't Drink the Water
Hello, Dolly!
Putney Swope
The Reivers
Support Your Local Sheriff!
Take the Money and Run
The Trouble with Girls
The Wrecking Crew

1970s
1970
The Aristocats
Catch-22
The Cheyenne Social Club
The Computer Wore Tennis Shoes
Hi, Mom!
MASH
Myra Breckinridge
The Out-of-Towners
Start the Revolution Without Me
There Was a Crooked Man...
Which Way to the Front?

1971
200 Motels
B.S. I Love You
Bananas
The Barefoot Executive
Carnal Knowledge
Happy Birthday, Wanda June
Harold and Maude
The Hospital
They Might Be Giants (film)
A New Leaf
Support Your Local Gunfighter!
Who Is Harry Kellerman and Why Is He Saying Those Terrible Things About Me?

1972
Another Nice Mess
Avanti!
Everything You Always Wanted to Know About Sex* (*But Were Afraid to Ask)
Fritz the Cat
The Heartbreak Kid
Now You See Him, Now You Don't
Pink Flamingos
Play It Again, Sam
Snoopy Come Home
What's Up, Doc?

1973
American Graffiti
Blume in Love
Cops and Robbers
Five on the Black Hand Side
The Last Detail
Paper Moon
Sleeper
The Sting

1974
Blazing Saddles
Dark Star
Down and Dirty Duck
Flesh Gordon
Ginger in the Morning
The Groove Tube
Harry and Tonto
Herbie Rides Again
The Longest Yard
The Nine Lives of Fritz the Cat
Phantom of the Paradise
The Thorn
Uptown Saturday Night
Young Frankenstein

1975
The Adventure of Sherlock Holmes' Smarter Brother
The Apple Dumpling Gang
The Fortune
Love and Death
Rooster Cogburn
Shampoo
The Strongest Man in the World
The Sunshine Boys

1976
The Bad News Bears
The Big Bus
Cannonball
Car Wash
Chesty Anderson, USN
Family Plot
The Gumball Rally
Gus
Murder by Death
Nickelodeon
The Shaggy D.A.
Silent Movie
Silver Streak
Tunnel Vision

1977
Annie Hall
The Bad News Bears in Breaking Training
Candleshoe
Grand Theft Auto
Handle With Care
Herbie Goes to Monte Carlo
Heroes
High Anxiety
The Kentucky Fried Movie
The Last Remake of Beau Geste
The Many Adventures of Winnie the Pooh
Oh, God!
A Piece of the Action
Race for Your Life, Charlie Brown
Smokey and the Bandit

1978
The Bad News Bears Go to Japan
California Suite
The Cat from Outer Space
Corvette Summer
The End
Every Which Way But Loose
Girlfriends
Goin' South
Heaven Can Wait
Hooper
Hot Lead and Cold Feet
National Lampoon's Animal House
Rabbit Test
Sextette
Up in Smoke
A Wedding

1979
10
1941
Americathon
The Apple Dumpling Gang Rides Again
Being There
Breaking Away
The Frisco Kid
The In-Laws
The Jerk
The Main Event
Manhattan
The Muppet Movie
The North Avenue Irregulars
Real Life
Rock 'n' Roll High School
Starting Over
The Villain

1980s

1980

9 to 5
Airplane!
Any Which Way You Can
Bon Voyage, Charlie Brown (and Don't Come Back!!)
The Blues Brothers
Caddyshack
Can't Stop the Music
Cheech & Chong's Next Movie
Foolin' Around
Galaxina
Hopscotch
How to Beat the High Co$t of Living
The Last Married Couple in America
Little Darlings

Melvin and Howard
Midnight Madness
The Nude Bomb
Popeye
Private Benjamin
The Private Eyes
Seems Like Old Times
Serial
Smokey and the Bandit II
Stardust Memories
Stir Crazy
The Stunt Man
Up the Academy
Used Cars

1981

All Night Long
Cannonball Run
Carbon Copy
Caveman
Chu Chu and the Philly Flash
Condorman
The Devil and Max Devlin
Going Ape!
Hardly Working
Heartbeeps
The History of the World Part 1

The Incredible Shrinking Woman
Modern Problems
Neighbors
On the Right Track
Paternity
Porky's
Private Lessons
Saturday the 14th
Shock Treatment
Stripes
Take This Job and Shove It
Under the Rainbow
Zorro, The Gay Blade

1982

1983

1984

1985

1986

1987

1988

1989

1990s

1990

1991

1992

1993

1994

1995

1996

1997

1998

1999

2000s

2000
100 Girls
Beethoven's 3rd
Charlie's Angels
Coyote Ugly
The Flintstones in Viva Rock Vegas
Geppetto
Keeping the Faith
Little Nicky
Loser
Me, Myself & Irene
Meet the Parents
Miss Congeniality
The Next Best Thing
Nutty Professor II: The Klumps
O Brother, Where Art Thou?
The Original Kings of Comedy
Ready to Rumble
The Replacements
Return to Me
Road Trip
Rugrats in Paris: The Movie
Scary Movie
Shanghai Noon
Snow Day
The Specials
The Tigger Movie
What Women Want
The Whole Nine Yards

2001

2002

2003

2004

2005

2006

2007

2008

2009

2010s

2010

 The Back-up Plan
 The Bounty Hunter
 Date Night
 Death at a Funeral
 Despicable Me
 Dinner for Schmucks
 Due Date
 Easy A
 Furry Vengeance
 Get Him to the Greek
 Going the Distance
 Grown Ups
 Gulliver's Travels
 Hot Tub Time Machine
 How Do You Know
 How to Train Your Dragon
 Just Wright
 Kick-Ass
 Killers

 Leap Year
 Letters to Juliet
 Life as We Know It
 Little Fockers
 Marmaduke
 Machete
 Megamind
 The Other Guys
 Our Family Wedding
 Scott Pilgrim vs. the World
 Sex and the City 2
 She's Out of My League
 Shrek Forever After
 The Spy Next Door
 The Switch
 Tangled
 Tooth Fairy
 Toy Story 3
 Valentine's Day
 Vampires Suck
 The Virginity Hit
 When in Rome
 Yogi Bear
 Youth in Revolt

2011

30 Minutes or Less
Alvin and the Chipmunks: Chipwrecked
Bad Teacher
Bernie
Big Mommas: Like Father, Like Son
Bridesmaids
Cars 2
The Change-Up
Crazy, Stupid, Love
The Dilemma
Friends with Benefits
From Prada to Nada
Hall Pass
The Hangover Part II
Horrible Bosses

I Don't Know How She Does It
Jack and Jill
Just Go with It
Kung Fu Panda 2
Larry Crowne
Madea's Big Happy Family
Midnight in Paris
Mr. Popper's Penguins
The Muppets
New Year's Eve
No Strings Attached
Our Idiot Brother
Paul
Puss in Boots
Rango
Rio
Something Borrowed
Spy Kids: All the Time in the World
Stonerville
Take Me Home Tonight
A Very Harold & Kumar 3D Christmas
What's Your Number?
Winnie the Pooh
Your Highness
Zookeeper

2012

21 Jump Street
American Reunion
The Babymakers
Bachelorette
The Campaign
Dark Shadows
The Dictator
Exit Strategy
The Five-Year Engagement
For a Good Time, Call...
Friends with Kids
The Guilt Trip
Here Comes the Boom
Hotel Transylvania
Madagascar 3: Europe's Most Wanted
Madea's Witness Protection
Men in Black 3

One Small Hitch
Parental Guidance
Pitch Perfect
Playing for Keeps
Project X
Ruby Sparks
Secret of the Wings
Seven Psychopaths
Silver Linings Playbook
Ted
Thanks for Sharing
That's My Boy
Think Like a Man
This Is 40
This Means War
Wanderlust
The Watch
Wreck-It Ralph

2013

21 and Over
Admission
Anchorman 2: The Legend Continues
Bad Milo!
Baggage Claim
The Croods
Delivery Man
Despicable Me 2
Don Jon
Frozen
Grown Ups 2
The Hangover Part III
A Haunted House
The Heat
Her
Identity Thief
In a World...

The Incredible Burt Wonderstone
The Internship
Jackass Presents: Bad Grandpa
Kick-Ass 2
Last Vegas
Machete Kills
 A Madea Christmas
Monsters University
Movie 43
Pain & Gain
R.I.P.D.
Scary Movie 5
The Starving Games
This Is the End
Warm Bodies
We're the Millers
The Wolf of Wall Street

2014

22 Jump Street
About Last Night
Adult Beginners
The Angriest Man in Brooklyn
Annie
Bad Words
Big Hero 6
Birdman
Blended
Chef
Dumb and Dumber To
The Grand Budapest Hotel
A Haunted House 2
Horrible Bosses 2
How to Train Your Dragon 2
The Interview
Laggies
The Lego Movie
Let's Be Cops
Life After Beth
Lust for Love
A Million Ways to Die in the West

Magic in the Moonlight
Mr. Peabody & Sherman
Muppets Most Wanted
Neighbors
Night at the Museum: Secret of the Tomb
The Nut Job
Obvious Child
The Other Woman
Think Like a Man Too
Paddington
Penguins of Madagascar
Playing It Cool
Ride Along
Rio 2
Search Party
Sex Tape
That Awkward Moment
The Skeleton Twins
Someone Marry Barry
St. Vincent
Tammy
They Came Together
Top Five

2015

 Absolutely Anything
 Aloha
 Alvin and the Chipmunks: The Road Chip
 Daddy's Home
 Entourage
 Get Hard
 The Good Dinosaur
 Goosebumps
 Hot Pursuit
 Hot Tub Time Machine 2
 Hotel Transylvania 2
 Inside Out
 Kitchen Sink
 Krampus
 The Last 5 Years
 Love, Rosie
 The Man from U.N.C.L.E.
 Minions

 Mortdecai
 Mr. Right
 The Night Before
 The Overnight
 Paul Blart: Mall Cop 2
 The Peanuts Movie
 Pitch Perfect 2
 Pixels
 Rock the Kasbah
 Scouts Guide to the Zombie Apocalypse
 Sisters
 Sleeping with Other People
 The SpongeBob Movie: Sponge Out of Water
 Spy
 Ted 2
 Trainwreck
 The Wedding Ringer
 Vacation
 What We Do in the Shadows

2016

 Absolutely Fabulous: The Movie
 The Angry Birds Movie
 Bad Moms
 Bad Santa 2
 Boo! A Madea Halloween
 The Boss
 The Bounce Back
 Bridget Jones's Baby
 The Bronze
 The Brothers Grimsby
 Café Society
 Central Intelligence
 Deadpool
 Dirty Grandpa
 The Do-Over
 The Edge of Seventeen
 Everybody Wants Some!!
 Finding Dory
 Ghostbusters
 Hail, Caesar!
 Hello, My Name is Doris
 How to Be Single
 Ice Age: Collision Course
 Joshy

 Keanu
 Keeping Up with the Joneses
 Kung Fu Panda 3
 La La Land
 Masterminds
 Mike and Dave Need Wedding Dates
 Moana
 My Blind Brother
 Neighbors 2: Sorority Rising
 Nerdland
 Norm of the North
 Office Christmas Party
 Pee-wee's Big Holiday
 The Perfect Match
 The Ridiculous 6
 Sausage Party
 The Secret Life of Pets
 Sing
 Storks
 Trolls
 True Memoirs of an International Assassin
 War Dogs
 Why Him?
 Zoolander 2
 Zootopia

2017

 Baby Driver
 The Babysitter
 A Bad Moms Christmas
 Baywatch
 The Big Sick
 Boo 2! A Madea Halloween
 The Boss Baby
 Captain Underpants: The First Epic Movie
 Cars 3
 CHiPs
 Coco
 Daddy's Home 2
 Dean
 Despicable Me 3
 Diary of a Wimpy Kid: The Long Haul
 A Dog's Purpose
 The Emoji Movie
 Father Figures
 Ferdinand
 Fist Fight

 Girls Trip
 Going in Style
 Happy Death Day
 The House
 How to Be a Latin Lover
 I, Tonya
 Jumanji: Welcome to the Jungle
 Kingsman: The Golden Circle
 The Lego Batman Movie
 Little Evil
 The Lovers
 Monster Trucks
 My Entire High School Sinking Into the Sea
 Naked
 Pitch Perfect 3
 Rough Night
 Sandy Wexler
 Skin: The Movie
 Smurfs: The Lost Village
 Snatched
 Wilson

2018

 Action Point
 Alex Strangelove
 Blockers
 Blindspotting
 Book Club
 Boundaries
 Bumblebee
 Can You Ever Forgive Me?
 Candy Jar
 The Christmas Chronicles
 Christopher Robin
 Crazy Rich Asians
 Deadpool 2
 Game Night
 Goosebumps 2: Haunted Halloween
 The Grinch
 Gringo
 The Happytime Murders
 Holmes and Watson
 Hotel Transylvania 3: Summer Vacation
 Ibiza
 I Feel Pretty
 Incredibles 2
 Instant Family
 Johnny English Strikes Again
 Juliet, Naked
 The Kissing Booth
 Life of the Party

 Like Father
 Love, Simon
 Mamma Mia! Here We Go Again
 Mary Poppins Returns
 Nappily Ever After
 Night School
 Nobody's Fool
 The Nutcracker and the Four Realms
 The Oath
 Ocean's 8
 Overboard
 Paddington 2
 Peter Rabbit
 The Princess Switch
 Ralph Breaks the Internet
 The Samuel Project
 Second Act
 Set It Up
 Sherlock Gnomes
 Show Dogs
 The Spy Who Dumped Me
 Sierra Burgess Is a Loser
 Super Troopers 2
 Tag
 Teen Titans Go! To the Movies
 To All the Boys I've Loved Before
 Tully
 Uncle Drew
 The Week Of
 When We First Met

2019

 Abominable
 The Addams Family
 Aladdin
 Always Be My Maybe
 The Angry Birds Movie 2
 Always Be My Maybe
 Booksmart
 Brittany Runs a Marathon
 Buffaloed
 Cats
 Dumbo
 Fighting with My Family
 Frozen II
 Good Boys
 Happy Death Day 2U
 How to Train Your Dragon: The Hidden World
 The Hustle
 Isn't It Romantic
 Jexi
 Jojo Rabbit
 Jumanji: The Next Level
 Knives Out
 The Lego Movie 2: The Second Part
 Last Christmas
 Late Night
 The Lion King
 The Last Laugh
 Let It Snow
 Little

 Long Shot
 A Madea Family Funeral
 Men in Black International
 Missing Link
 Murder Mystery
 Noelle
 Otherhood
 The Perfect Date
 Playing with Fire
 Pokémon Detective Pikachu
 Poms
 The Secret Life of Pets 2
 A Rainy Day in New York
 Sextuplets
 Shaft
 Shazam!
 Someone Great
 Spies in Disguise
 Stuber
 Tall Girl
 Toy Story 4
 UglyDolls
 Unicorn Store
 The Upside
 What Men Want
 Where'd You Go, Bernadette
 Wine Country
 Wonder Park
 Yesterday
 Zombieland 2

2020s

2020

 Bad Boys for Life
 Bad Trip
 Birds of Prey (and the Fantabulous Emancipation of One Harley Quinn)
 Dolittle
 Free Guy
 Friend of the World
 Happiest Season
 Holidate
 Hubie Halloween
 The Kissing Booth 2
 Like a Boss
 The Lovebirds
 Love, Guaranteed

 My Spy
 Onward
 Palm Springs
 Reboot Camp
 Scoob!
 Sonic the Hedgehog
 Soul
 The SpongeBob Movie: Sponge on the Run
 Superintelligence
 The Thing About Harry
 The Witches
 To All the Boys: P.S. I Still Love You

2021

 To All the Boys: Always and Forever
 Aquarium of the Dead
 Bad Trip
 Barb and Star Go to Vista Del Mar
 Benny Loves You
 The Boss Baby: Family Business
 Breaking News in Yuba County
 Clifford the Big Red Dog
 Coming 2 America
 Cruella
 Dream Horse
 Encanto
 Finding You
 Flora & Ulysses
 French Exit
 Ghostbusters: Afterlife
 Happily
 I Care a Lot
 Long Weekend
 Locked Down
 The Map of Tiny Perfect Things
 The Mitchells vs. the Machines
 Moxie

 The Paper Tigers
 Peter Rabbit 2: The Runaway
 Plan B
 Senior Moment
 Shiva Baby
 Sing 2
 Space Jam: A New Legacy
 The SpongeBob Movie: Sponge on the Run
 Thunder Force
 Together Together
 Tom & Jerry
 The Ultimate Playlist of Noise
 We Broke Up
 Willy's Wonderland
 Wish Dragon
 Yes Day

References

Comedy
Lists of comedy films